Zvyozdny is an urban locality (an urban-type settlement) in Ust-Kutsky District of Irkutsk Oblast, Russia. Population:

Geography
Zvyozdny is located on the right bank of the mouth of the Niya River, a right tributary of the Tayura. Zvyozdny is crossed by the Baikal-Amur Mainline and the interregional highway 25K-258 Ust-Kut - Severobaikalsk.

References

Urban-type settlements in Irkutsk Oblast